Selkie is a village of Kontiolahti in North Karelia, Finland. It has a population of about 300.

References

External links
Selkie village website

Geography of North Karelia
Villages in Finland